Sue Black may refer to:

 Sue Black, Baroness Black of Strome (born 1961), Scottish forensic anthropologist
 Sue Black (computer scientist) (born 1962), English computer scientist

See also 
 Susan Black (disambiguation)